Peter Jefferson (February 29, 1708 – August 17, 1757) was a planter, cartographer and politician in colonial Virginia best known for being the father of the third president of the United States, Thomas Jefferson. The "Fry-Jefferson Map", created by Peter in collaboration with Joshua Fry in 1757, accurately charted the Allegheny Mountains for the first time and showed the route of "The Great Road from the Yadkin River through Virginia to Philadelphia distant 455 Miles"—what would later come to be known as the Great Wagon Road.

Early life

Jefferson was born at a settlement called Osbornes along the James River in what is now Chesterfield County, Virginia and was the son of Captain Thomas Jefferson, a large property owner, and Mary Field, who was the daughter of Major Peter Field of New Kent County and granddaughter of Henry Soane of the Virginia House of Burgesses. Jefferson's mother, Mary Field Jefferson, died when he was eight years of age.  During his childhood, he learned about plantation management from his father. When he was 18 years of age, he managed his father's plantations. His father died when he was 24 years of age. 

He did not receive any formal education while young, but according to his son Thomas Jefferson, he nevertheless "read much and improved himself" and provided for education for his children. He was the fourth child of six children.

Personal life and death
From his father's estate, he inherited land and enslaved people in 1731 along the James River near Isham Randolph and his nephew William Randolph of Tuckahoe. Jefferson's residence, called Fine Creek Manor, was in present-day Powhatan County, Virginia near Fine Creek. (It is now part of Fine Creek Mills Historic District).  He was a sheriff, surveyor, and justice of the peace. In 1734, Jefferson claimed the land in present-day Albemarle County, Virginia, which he eventually named Shadwell. By purchase and patent, Peter Jefferson assembled a second plantation which he called “Snowdon” (aka Snowden), located at the Horseshoe Bend of what was then known as the Fluvanna River (later the James River). The name recalls Mount Snowdon, presumably the home of his Jefferson ancestors.

He married Jane Randolph, daughter of Isham Randolph and granddaughter of William Randolph, in 1739. For a year or two following his marriage, they lived at Fine Creek Manor. Jefferson built a house on the Shadwell tract, after his wife's birthplace, in 1741 or 1742. They moved there sometime before his son, Thomas, was born in 1743. His friend William Randolph, a widower and his wife's cousin, died in 1745, having appointed Jefferson as guardian to manage the Tuckahoe Plantation until his son came of age. That year the Jeffersons relocated to Randolph's plantation in the Fine Creek area. 

Jane and Peter offered a privileged life for their family whether in established areas of eastern Virginia or, later, as they settled in the Shadwell plantation of the Piedmont. They ate on fine dishware, frequently entertained, enjoyed classic books and music, and attended dances. The family was considered prosperous and cultured. While at Tuckahoe, Peter also oversaw the development of his plantation at Shadwell, traveling there as needed while also deftly managing the affairs of the Tuckahoe plantation.

In 1752, Jefferson returned to Shadwell, which was improved to include a mill along the Rivanna River. A member of the gentry, he was a host to his peers and to Native Americans who travelled on official business to Colonial Williamsburg. A favored guest was Cherokee chief Ontasseté.

Jefferson had more than sixty slaves at Shadwell. He died there in 1757. His land was divided between his two sons, young Thomas and Randolph. Thomas inherited the land along the Rivanna River with views of the mountain to be called Monticello. Randolph inherited "Snowdon," the so-called Fluvanna Lands.All of his children were beneficiaries of his estate.

Children
Peter Jefferson's children were:

 Jane Jefferson (1740–1765) - died unmarried at age 25
 Mary Jefferson Bolling (1741–1804) - married John Bolling III, who served in the Virginia House of Burgesses and who was a descendant of Pocahontas
 Thomas Jefferson (1743–1826) third president of the United States of America.
 Elizabeth Jefferson (1744–1774) - mentally handicapped.
 Martha Jefferson Carr (1746–1811) - married Dabney Carr, founder of the underground Committee of Correspondence in Virginia on the eve of the American Revolution
 Peter Field Jefferson (1748) - died as an infant.
 unnamed son (1750) - died as an infant.
 Lucy Jefferson Lewis (1752–1810) - married Charles Lilburn Lewis
 Anne Scott Jefferson Marks (1755–1828) - twin of Randolph
 Randolph Jefferson (1755–1815) - twin of Anna Scott

Thomas Jefferson, Lucy Jefferson, and Randolph Jefferson had several descendants in common with the Lewis family of Virginia.

Career
As described by Andrew Burstein in The Washington Post, Jefferson was "an accomplished, strong-minded, self-reliant frontiersman" of the eighteenth century who migrated within Virginia to the western uplands called the Piedmont. He was among the initial settlers of Albemarle County, Virginia in 1737 and acquired property over the years to farm tobacco. By the time of his death, he held 7,200 acres. 

He was also a cartographer and surveyor. In 1746, he and Thomas Lewis ran the famous "Fairfax Line"—a surveyor's line between the headwaters of the Rappahannock and North Branch Potomac Rivers—which established the limits of the "Northern Neck land grant" (also known as the "Fairfax Grant").

In 1749, Peter Jefferson, along with Joshua Fry, Thomas Walker, Edmund Pendleton and others, established the Loyal Company of Virginia, and were granted 800,000 acres (3,200 km2) in present-day Virginia, West Virginia and Kentucky. In the same year, with Joshua Fry, Jefferson extended the survey of the Virginia-North Carolina border, begun by William Byrd II some time earlier.  The detailed Fry-Jefferson Map, cited by his son Thomas in his 1781 book Notes on the State of Virginia, was produced by him and Fry.

In 1754 and 1755, he served in the Virginia House of Burgesses.

See also
Thomas Jefferys, in 1776 producer of The American Atlas: Or, A Geographical Description Of The Whole Continent Of America
 John Harvie Sr., Peter Jefferson chief executor and guardian of Thomas
North Carolina–Tennessee–Virginia Corners

Notes

References

Further reading
 
 
 
 
 
 
 

1708 births
1757 deaths
American cartographers
American people of English descent
American planters
American surveyors
American slave owners
Fathers of presidents of the United States
Fathers of vice presidents of the United States
House of Burgesses members
Jefferson family
People from Albemarle County, Virginia
People from Chesterfield County, Virginia
Randolph family of Virginia
Virginia colonial people